John Malone is a businessman and philanthropist.

John Malone may also refer to:

Musicians
J.J. Malone (1935-2004), American West Coast blues, electric blues and soul blues guitarist, singer and keyboardist
J.D. Malone, singer-songwriter

Fictional characters
John Malone, character in Baby (2000 film)
Jack Malone, John 'Jack' Malone, Without a Trace character

Others
John R. Malone, inventor of Unifon
John Joseph Malone, Canadian flying ace
John Grover Malone, American football player
John Malone, American voice actor
J. B. Malone, hillwalking enthusiast

See also
Johnny Malone (disambiguation)